Leucochimona is a butterfly genus in the family Riodinidae present only in the Neotropical realm.

Species 
Leucochimona aequatorialis (Seitz, 1913) present in Ecuador
Leucochimona icare (Hübner, [1819]) present in French Guiana, Guyana, Suriname, Colombia, Bolivia and Brazil 
Leucochimona hyphea (Cramer, 1776) present in Guyana and Peru
Leucochimona iphias Stichel, 1909 present in Panama
Leucochimona lagora (Herrich-Schäffer, [1853]) present in Panama, Nicaragua, French Guiana, Guyana, Suriname, Ecuador, Colombia and Brazil
Leucochimona lepida (Godman & Salvin, [1885]) present in Nicaragua, Guatemala and Panama
Leucochimona matisca (Hewitson, 1860) present in Brazil, Bolivia and Peru
Leucochimona molina (Godman & Salvin, [1885]) present in Nicaragua, Costa Rica and Panama
Leucochimona vestalis (Bates, 1865) present in Ecuador, Nicaragua, Guatemala and Panama

Sources 
Leucochimona at funet

External links

Leucochimona at Butterflies of America

Riodinidae
Butterfly genera
Taxa named by Hans Ferdinand Emil Julius Stichel